The Sue Tyler Friedman Medal is awarded by the Geological Society of London for work on the history of geology.  Established in 1987, it is named after the wife of academic journal editor and publisher Gerald M. Friedman, and was funded by a gift to the Geological Society by Friedman's company, Northeastern Science Foundation, of Troy, New York.

Sue Tyler Friedman Medallists 
Source: The Geological Society

See also

 List of geology awards
 Prizes named after people

References 

Geology awards
Awards of the Geological Society of London
British awards
Awards established in 1988